Hartford is a neighborhood located along the western edge of Providence, Rhode Island.  Route 6 and the Woonasquatucket River separates it from Olneyville.

History
Prior to the arrival of white settlers, the area had been used as a soapstone quarry by the Narragansett natives.  The first white settlers were farmers.  Throughout the seventeenth and eighteenth centuries, settlers built dwellings intended for temporary stays, though later, attracted by the country atmosphere, they adopted permanent residence.

In the early nineteenth century, the proximity of the Woonasquatucket River allowed the area to begin industrialization.  In 1812 the Mill Merino became the second textile establishment in the general area, producing a soft material called "merino cloth".  Merino Village, consisting of stone houses, a general store, and water supply, was built by the company to support its workers. As the area began to develop further, its economic opportunities attracted immigrants.  Though initially primarily Irish, later waves of immigration brought Polish and later Italian immigrants to the neighborhood.

In the 1950s, massive housing projects altered the fabric of Hartford.  The construction of Route 6 meant the demolition of a swath of working-class housing, while two large low-income housing projects (Hartford Park Public Housing Project and Manton Heights Housing Projects) visually demonstrated a shift in the neighborhood's demographics.  As with much public housing in the United States, both fell victim to neglect and vandalism, with the demolition of a significant number of units occurring in the 1980s.

Demographics
According to the 1990 census, three out of four residents in Hartford were white; about one in seven was Hispanic, nearly 10% were African American, and about 4% were Asian.  True to Hartford's heritage, the largest fraction (27%) of employed residents work in manufacturing.  The next largest fraction of employment (18%) was taken up by professional services.  The unemployment rate for Hartford was 9.4% compared to citywide average of 9.2%.

According to the Providence Plan, a local nonprofit aimed at improving city life, today 48.4% of residents are Hispanic, 33.6% of residents are white, 10.6% are African-American, 5% are Asian, and nearly 2% are Native American. 64% of children under the age of six speak a language other than English as their primary language.

The median family income is $28,065, below the citywide average of $32,058. 40% of families live below the poverty line while 18% of residents receive some form of public assistance. 12% of children under the age of six have suffered from high lead exposure, below the citywide average of 19%.

Government
Hartford is within Ward 7, which is represented in the Providence City Council by Democrat John I. Igliozzi.

Merino Park

Merino Park is a  park on the banks of the Woonasquatucket River Located near the former Merino Mill, the site was previously a sheep farm, a skating pond, a landfill, and a storage site for road salt. In the 1990s, the park was condemned as a "brownfield." By the early 2000s, the site was cleaned up as a public park. The park features a tot lot, picnic areas, lighted basketball courts, and a bicycle path connected to the Woonasquatucket River Greenway. A pedestrian bridge connects Merino Park with the Manton neighborhood.

Located between Hartford Avenue and Route 6, it is the only large public park in Hartford.

References

Hispanic and Latino American culture in Providence, Rhode Island
Irish-American culture in Rhode Island
Italian-American culture in Providence, Rhode Island
Polish-American culture in Rhode Island
Neighborhoods in Providence, Rhode Island